The following is a list of the 571 communes of the Doubs department of France.

The communes cooperate in the following intercommunalities (as of 2020):
Grand Besançon Métropole
Pays de Montbéliard Agglomération
Communauté de communes Altitude 800
Communauté de communes des Deux Vallées Vertes
Communauté de communes du Doubs Baumois
Communauté de communes du Grand Pontarlier
Communauté de communes des Lacs et Montagnes du Haut-Doubs
Communauté de communes Loue-Lison
Communauté de communes de Montbenoît
Communauté de communes du Pays de Maîche
Communauté de communes du Pays de Sancey-Belleherbe
Communauté de communes du Pays de Villersexel (partly)
Communauté de communes du pays d'Héricourt (partly)
Communauté de communes du Plateau de Frasne et du Val de Drugeon
Communauté de communes du Plateau de Russey
Communauté de communes des Portes du Haut-Doubs
Communauté de communes du Val de Morteau
Communauté de communes du Val Marnaysien (partly)

References

Doubs